Psalm 98 is the 98th psalm of the Book of Psalms, beginning in English in the King James Version: "O sing unto the Lord a new song; for he hath done marvellous things". The Book of Psalms starts the third section of the Hebrew Bible, and, as such, is a book of the Christian Old Testament. In Latin, it is known as Cantate Domino. In the slightly different numbering system in the Greek Septuagint version of the Bible, and in the Latin Vulgate, this psalm is Psalm 97. The psalm is a hymn psalm, one of the Royal Psalms, praising God as the King of His people. Like Psalms 33 and 96, it calls for the singing of "a new song". 

The psalm forms a regular part of Jewish, Catholic, Lutheran, Anglican and other Protestant liturgies. It has inspired hymns such as "Joy to the World" and "Nun singt ein neues Lied dem Herren", and has often been set to music, including by Claudio Monteverdi, Marc-Antoine Charpentier, Dieterich Buxtehude and Antonín Dvořák who set it in Czech in his Biblical Songs.

Background and themes
Psalm 98 describes God's redemption of Israel and the rejoicing that will ensue. It also features many expressions and instruments of music and song. According to the Midrash Tanchuma, Psalm 98 is the tenth and final song that the Jewish people will sing after the final redemption. Grammatically, the reference to a shir chadash (a new song) in verse 1 is a masculine construction, in contrast to the shira (song) mentioned throughout the Tanakh, a feminine construction. Thus, the Midrash teaches that the shir chadash is a song of the future.

Text

Hebrew 
Following is the Hebrew text of Psalm 98:

English translation (King James Version) 
The King James Version's English translation of Psalm 98 reads:
 O sing unto the  a new song; for he hath done marvellous things: his right hand, and his holy arm, hath gotten him the victory.
 The  hath made known his salvation: his righteousness hath he openly shewed in the sight of the heathen.
 He hath remembered his mercy and his truth toward the house of Israel: all the ends of the earth have seen the salvation of our God.
 Let the sea roar, and the fulness thereof; the world, and they that dwell therein.
 Let the floods clap their hands: let the hills be joyful together

Uses

Judaism
Psalm 98 is the fourth of six psalms recited during the Kabbalat Shabbat (Welcoming the Shabbat) service in Ashkenazic, Hasidic and some Sephardic communities.. It is one of the additional psalms recited during the morning prayer on Shabbat in the Sephardi tradition. According to the Abudraham, this psalm corresponds to the seventh of the Ten Utterances of Creation, "Let the waters swarm", corresponding to verse 7 of this psalm, "Let the sea roar".

Verse 6 is one of the ten verses recited during the Mussaf Amidah on Rosh Hashana in the verses of Shofarot.

New Testament 
Verse 3 is quoted in Mary's song of praise, the Magnificat, in Luke .

Christianity
The psalm may be recited as a canticle in the Anglican liturgy of Evening Prayer according to the Book of Common Prayer as an alternative to the Magnificat, when it is referred to by its incipit as Cantate Domino. It is not included as a canticle in Common Worship, but it does of course appear in the psalter.

Musical settings
Marc-Antoine Charpentier composed in 1679 - 80, one Cantate Domino H.176, for 3 voices, 2 treble instruments, and continuo. Michel-Richard de Lalande composed one grand motet (S72) in 1720, Dieterich Buxtehude, Nicolas Bernier and Claudio Monteverdi also. Loys Bourgeois set the Psalm in the Genevan Psalter, with a melody used also for the German hymn "Nun singt ein neues Lied dem Herren" (1967) by Georg Thurmair. Georg Philipp Telemann's Singet dem Herrn ein neues Lied, TWV 1:1345 is a setting of Psalm 98. 

"Joy to the World", one of the most popular English Christmas carols, is a lyrical adaptation of Psalm 98 written in 1719 by Isaac Watts and set by Lowell Mason to a tune attributed to George Frideric Handel. The 1941 hymn "Singt dem Herrn ein neues Lied" was also inspired by Psalm 98.

Czech composer Antonín Dvořák set part of Psalm 98 (together with part of Psalm 96) to music as No. 10 of his Biblical Songs in 1894. John Rutter set the psalm as the first movement of his choral work The Falcon. Settings were also written by David Conte and by Arvo Pärt in Latin.

Bernard Barrell composed Show Yourselves Joyful unto the Lord, an anthem for female chorus and organ, Op. 130 (1993).

Andrew Lloyd Webber has set the psalm as a coronation anthem to be performed at the coronation of King Charles III of the United Kingdom.

References

External links

 
 A recording of a tune to the psalm used during the Kabbalat Shabbat service
 Psalms Chapter 98 text in Hebrew and English, mechon-mamre.org
 Sing a new song to the Lord, for he has done marvelous deeds. text and footnotes, usccb.org United States Conference of Catholic Bishops
 Psalm 98:1 introduction and text, biblestudytools.com
 Psalm 98 enduringword.com
 Hymns for Psalm 98 hymnary.org

098